The 2013 Richmond Raiders season was the fourth season as a professional indoor football franchise and their second in the Professional Indoor Football League (PIFL). One of 7 teams competing in the PIFL for the 2013 season.

The team played their home games under head coach James Fuller at the Richmond Coliseum in Richmond, Virginia. The Raiders earned a 7-5 record, placing tied for 2nd in the league, qualifying for the playoffs. They were defeated in PIFL Cup II, 44-70 by the Alabama Hammers.

Schedule
Key:

Regular season
All start times are local to home team

Postseason

Roster

Division Standings

References

External links
 2013 stats

Richmond Raiders
Richmond Raiders
Richmond Raiders